Sébastien Renot (born 11 November 1989) is a French professional footballer who plays as a goalkeeper for Versailles.

Club career
In June 2022, Renot signed with Versailles.

References

1989 births
Living people
Association football goalkeepers
French footballers
Ligue 2 players
Championnat National players
Championnat National 2 players
Championnat National 3 players
Paris Saint-Germain F.C. players
AS Poissy players
Red Star F.C. players
ES Troyes AC players
FC Versailles 78 players